Pontenure is a comune (municipality) in the Province of Piacenza in the Italian region Emilia-Romagna, located about  northwest of Bologna and about  southeast of Piacenza.  

Pontenure borders the following municipalities: Cadeo, Caorso, Carpaneto Piacentino, Cortemaggiore, Piacenza, Podenzano, San Giorgio Piacentino.

References

External links
 Official website

Cities and towns in Emilia-Romagna